The Eatontown Public Schools is a community public school district that serves students in pre-kindergarten through eighth grade from Eatontown in Monmouth County, New Jersey, United States.

As of the 2018–19 school year, the district, comprising four schools, had an enrollment of 962 students and 101.5 classroom teachers (on an FTE basis), for a student–teacher ratio of 9.5:1.

The district is classified by the New Jersey Department of Education as being in District Factor Group "FG", the fourth-highest of eight groupings. District Factor Groups organize districts statewide to allow comparison by common socioeconomic characteristics of the local districts. From lowest socioeconomic status to highest, the categories are A, B, CD, DE, FG, GH, I and J.

Public school students in ninth through twelfth grades attend Monmouth Regional High School, located in Tinton Falls. The high school is part of the Monmouth Regional High School District, which also serves students from Shrewsbury Township and Tinton Falls, along with students from Naval Weapons Station Earle. As of the 2018–19 school year, the high school had an enrollment of 972 students and 91.0 classroom teachers (on an FTE basis), for a student–teacher ratio of 10.7:1.

Schools
Schools in the district (with 2018–19 enrollment data from the National Center for Education Statistics) are:
Elementary schools
Meadowbrook Elementary School with 292 students in grades K-2)
Valerie Cioffi, Principal
Woodmere Elementary School with 232 students in grades PreK and 3-4
Kevin Iozzi, Principal
Margaret L. Vetter Elementary School with 199 students in grades 5-6
Tara Mcuhilla, Principal
Middle school
Memorial Middle School with 220 students in grades 7 and 8
Kristoffer Brogna, Principal

Administration
Core members of the district's administration are:
Scott T. McCue, Superintendent of Schools
Lori Youngclaus, School Business Administrator / Board Secretary

Board of education
The district's board of education, with nine members, sets policy and oversees the fiscal and educational operation of the district through its administration. As a Type II school district, the board's trustees are elected directly by voters to serve three-year terms of office on a staggered basis, with three seats up for election each year held (since 2012) as part of the November general election.

References

External links
Eatontown Public Schools

Data for Eatontown Public Schools, National Center for Education Statistics
Monmouth Regional High School District

Eatontown, New Jersey
New Jersey District Factor Group FG
School districts in Monmouth County, New Jersey